Avianca Building is a 161-meter-tall office skyscraper located at the intersection of 16th street and Seventh Avenue, next to Santander Park in the city of Bogotá, Colombia.

History
Its design and construction were awarded to Esguerra Saenz, Urdaneta, Samper and Co., Ricaurte Prieto Carrizosa and Italian Domenico Parma, after a call for design proposals among the most recognized architecture firms at the time. The design of the building was completed in 1963, and its construction took place between 1966 and 1969, built on the former grounds of the Regina hotel. Its inauguration was at the end of 1969. At that time it was the tallest international style skyscraper in South America. The building was erected for the airline Avianca.

Features
It is currently in use and has 40 floors. The facades of the building are defined as continuous windows on both sides. The international style designs.

Fire
Shortly after 7 a.m. on July 23, 1973, a fire started on the 14th floor, where many things were stored, such as rugs, carpets, and gasoline. The building workers tried to douse the flames with buckets and fire extinguishers. After 15 minutes, the firefighters arrived and got on, with the misfortune that the hoses only reached up to the 12th floor. The flames went from the 14th to the 37th floor. People who were in the building at that time walked up the stairs. Rescue operations were carried out with helicopters that launched torrents of water. Some panic-stricken people jumped into the void and died. Others reached the roof, where they were taken out by helicopter. The incident left 4 dead and 63 injured. The structure did not suffer considerable damage.

See also
Avianca
List of tallest buildings in Colombia

References

Skyscraper office buildings in Colombia
Buildings and structures in Bogotá
Office buildings completed in 1969